The 2018–19 MDFA Elite Division is the 106th season of the MDFA Elite Division, the top-tier football league in Mumbai, a city in the Indian state of Maharashtra. ONGC F.C. were the defending champions. The league will commence from 1 September 2018.

Restructured
The 106th season of the MDFA Elite Division has been restructured. The league will be played between 26 teams (highest no. of teams ever) which will be divided into two groups. The Group A contains public sector clubs and the Group B contains private owned clubs. This decision was taken after the failure of private clubs who were not able to finish top 3 in the league table due to which clubs were not allowed entry into the I-League 2nd Division, another reason was the public sector clubs commitment for company tournaments due to which there were matches which got postponed, delaying the league further. The table standings of Group B will be considered for the upcoming seasons of I-League 2nd Division.

Format
The league will be played in two stages: the Preliminary and the Playoffs. 13 teams each in two groups. In Preliminary round, the teams will play against each other only once. After the completion of Preliminary round the top 3 teams from both the group will advance to the Playoffs.

League table
Group A

Group B

Playoffs

Group stage
Group A

Group B

Semi finals

Final

References 

MDFA Elite Division
2018–19 in Indian football leagues